Novoyarki is a rural locality (a selo) and the administrative center of Novoyarkovsky Selsoviet, Kamensky District, Altai Krai, Russia. The population was 1,168 as of 2013. There are 18 streets.

Geography 
Novoyarki is located 42 km southwest of Kamen-na-Obi (the district's administrative centre) by road. Poperechnoye is the nearest rural locality.

References 

Rural localities in Kamensky District, Altai Krai